Basil L. Stewart is a Canadian politician served as the mayor of Summerside, Prince Edward Island from 2018 to 2022. He previously served as mayor from 1985 to 2014 and as the president of the Canadian Federation of Municipalities in 2009–2010.  Stewart was defeated in the 2014 Summerside mayoral election by Bill Martin. He returned to office, winning the 2018 Summerside mayoral election, but lost his bid for re-election in 2022.

Before mayorship
Before his election as mayor, Stewart was a police officer for the Summerside Police Department from 1971 to 1984, when he retired from the force.

Mayorship
After his retirement from the police force, Stewart entered municipal politics, being elected mayor of the Town of Summerside in 1985. He was re-elected in 1988 and 1991. In 1994, he became the first mayor of the now City of Summerside (Summerside formerly being a town). He was re-elected in the municipal elections held in 1997, 2000, 2003, 2006 and 2010.

In 1993, Stewart ran in a federal election as the Progressive Conservative candidate for the riding of Egmont.  He was defeated by then-incumbent Liberal MP Joe McGuire, who won with a plurality of approximately 3,700 votes.

He was accused of wasting $1.3 million of taxpayers' money, which was forwarded as a purported deposit towards a Michael Jackson tribute concert that never ended up happening, "In January 2011, the city filed a complaint with the United States District Court, Northern District of California, San Jose Division, for fraud, conspiracy to commit fraud, negligent misrepresentation and rescission (rescinding) of a contract against Katrina Berg Sussmeier and Starlink Productions Inc."

At the 2014 Summerside mayoral election, Bill Martin, a Summerside businessman, was elected mayor with a vote of 4614 compared to Stewart's 2092, thus ending Stewart's 29-year run as mayor of Summerside.

Goals and objectives
Stewart has been instrumental in drawing large tournaments and events, such as the Canadian PeeWee Baseball Championship, the Canadian Women's Softball Championship, and an exhibition National Hockey League game to the city. He was also a major force behind the construction of the Consolidated Credit Union Place.

Other associations
Stewart is also a member of various associations. He is the President of the Federation of Canadian Municipalities, and a member of the Federation of Prince Edward Island Municipalities, and National Board of Directors to Sustainable Municipal Infrastructure. In the past, he was also served as Chair of Atlantic Caucus in 1998 and Chair of National Economic Development Committee from 1998–2000.

In 2015, he was named to the National Capital Commission. In 2017, Stewart was named to the Order of Canada.

Lawsuit against David Griffin
Mayor Stewart and city council of Summerside filed a lawsuit against Deputy Police Chief David Griffin in 1997.  The case is still in the courts as of October 2010 appealing the payment of interest on the damages owed to Griffin based on a judgement in March 2006 by Supreme Court Justice Wayne Cheverie who ruled in favour of Griffin in his malicious prosecution suit against the city.

Family and interests
Stewart lives in Summerside with his wife, Gail Inman-Stewart. He has two children—Mary-Jane (Steve) Dyer and Major (Holly Peters) Stewart. Stewart also has four granddaughters — Mya Stewart and Amber, Emma and Madison Dyer. He has four grandsons- Brett, Isaac and Joseph Stewart, and Lincoln Dyer.

His interests include hockey, swimming, and music (he plays guitar, harmonica, fiddle,  and mandolin).

Electoral record

References

External links
Mayor Basil Stewart bio

Year of birth missing (living people)
Canadian police officers
Living people
Mayors of Summerside, Prince Edward Island
Prince Edward Island candidates for Member of Parliament
Progressive Conservative Party of Canada candidates for the Canadian House of Commons
Candidates in the 1993 Canadian federal election
Members of the Order of Canada